Moye is a surname and a given name. It means "With Royalty". People named Moye include:

Given name 
 Guan Moye (born 1955), pen name Mo Yan, Chinese novelist and short-story writer
 Moye Kolodin (born 1987), German classical pianist
 Moye W. Stephens (1907–1995), American pioneer aviator and businessman, co-founder of Northrop Aircraft, Inc.

Surname 
 Derek Moye (born 1988), American National Football League player
 Famoudou Don Moye (born 1946), American jazz percussionist and drummer
 Jean-Martin Moye (1730–1793), French Catholic priest, missionary in China and founder of the Sisters of the Congregation of Divine Providence; beatified by the Catholic Church
 Malina Moye (born 1984), American singer, songwriter, guitarist and entrepreneur
 Michael G. Moye (born 1954), American former television writer and producer
 Muhiyidin Moye (1985–2018)
 Rick Moye (born 1956), American politician

See also
 Moye (disambiguation)
 Moy (surname)
 Moi (name)
 Moyes, a surname
 Moi (name)